Joseph George, better known as Joju George is an Indian actor, playback singer and producer who works mainly in Malayalam cinema.

As actor 
All films are in Malayalam language unless otherwise noted.

Tamil films

As producer

As playback singer

References

George, Joju